Bogdan Ridge (Rid Bogdan \'rid 'bog-dan\) is a conspicuous rocky ridge of elevation 440 m forming the northeast extremity of Breznik Heights, Greenwich Island in the South Shetland Islands, Antarctica.  The ridge extends 1.3 km westwards from Santa Cruz Point and surmounts Gruev Cove to the south.

The feature is named after Bogdan Peak, the summit of Sredna Gora Mountain in Central Bulgaria.

Location

Maps
 L.L. Ivanov et al. Antarctica: Livingston Island and Greenwich Island, South Shetland Islands. Scale 1:100000 topographic map. Sofia: Antarctic Place-names Commission of Bulgaria, 2005.
 L.L. Ivanov. Antarctica: Livingston Island and Greenwich, Robert, Snow and Smith Islands. Scale 1:120000 topographic map.  Troyan: Manfred Wörner Foundation, 2009.

References
 Bogdan Ridge. SCAR Composite Antarctic Gazetteer
 Bulgarian Antarctic Gazetteer. Antarctic Place-names Commission. (details in Bulgarian, basic data in English)

External links
 Bogdan Ridge. Copernix satellite image

Ridges of Greenwich Island
Bulgaria and the Antarctic